The Invisible Man is a science fiction novel by H. G. Wells. Originally serialised in Pearson's Weekly in 1897, it was published as a novel the same year. The Invisible Man to whom the title refers is Griffin, a scientist who has devoted himself to research into optics and who invents a way to change a body's refractive index to that of air so that it neither absorbs nor reflects light. He carries out this procedure on himself and renders himself invisible, but fails in his attempt to reverse it. A practitioner of random and irresponsible violence, Griffin has become an iconic character in horror fiction.

While its predecessors, The Time Machine and The Island of Doctor Moreau, were written using first-person narrators, Wells adopts a third-person objective point of view in The Invisible Man. The novel is considered influential, and helped establish Wells as the "father of science fiction".

Plot summary
A mysterious man, Griffin, referred to as 'the stranger', arrives at the local inn owned by Mr. and Mrs. Hall of the English village of Iping, West Sussex, during a snowstorm. The stranger wears a long-sleeved, thick coat and gloves; his face is hidden entirely by bandages except for a prosthetic nose, and he wears a wide-brimmed hat. He is excessively reclusive, irascible, unfriendly, and introverted. He demands to be left alone and spends most of his time in his rooms working with a set of chemicals and laboratory apparatus, only venturing out at night. He also causes a lot of accidents, but when Mrs. Hall addresses this, the stranger angrily demands that the cost of the damage be put on his bill. While Griffin is staying at the inn, hundreds of strange glass bottles arrive. Many local townspeople believe this to be very odd. He becomes the talk of the village with many theorizing as to his origins.

Meanwhile, a mysterious burglary occurs in the village. Griffin is running out of money and is trying to find a way to pay for his board and lodging. When his landlady demands that he pay his bill and quit the premises, he reveals his invisibility to her in a fit of anger. An attempt to apprehend the stranger by police officer Jaffers is thwarted when he undresses to take advantage of his invisibility, fights off his would-be captors, and flees to the South Downs.

There Griffin coerces a tramp, Thomas Marvel, to become his assistant. With Marvel, he returns to the village to recover three notebooks that contain records of his experiments. Marvel attempts to betray the Invisible Man, who threatens to kill him. Marvel escapes to the seaside town of Port Burdock, pursued to a local inn by the Invisible Man, who is shot by one of the bar patrons.

The Invisible Man takes shelter in a nearby house that turns out to belong to Dr. Kemp, a former acquaintance from medical school. To Kemp, he reveals his true identity. Griffin is an albino former medical student who left medicine to devote himself to optics.

Griffin tells Kemp the story of how he invented chemicals capable of rendering bodies invisible, which he first tried on a cat, then himself, how he burned down the boarding house he was staying in to cover his tracks, found himself ill-equipped to survive in the open, eventually stole some clothing from a theatrical supply shop on Drury Lane, and then headed to Iping to attempt to reverse the invisibility. Having been driven somewhat unhinged by the procedure and his experiences, he now imagines that he can make Kemp his secret confederate, describing a plan to use his invisibility to terrorise the nation.

Kemp has already denounced Griffin to the local authorities, led by Port Burdock's chief of police, Colonel Adye, and is waiting for help to arrive as he listens to this wild proposal. When Adye and his men arrive at Kemp's house, Griffin fights his way out and the next day leaves a note announcing that Kemp himself will be the first man to be killed in the "Reign of Terror". Kemp, a cool-headed character, tries to organise a plan to use himself as bait to trap the Invisible Man, but a note that he sends is stolen from his servant by Griffin. During the chase the invisible Griffin arms himself with an iron bar and kills a bystander.

Griffin shoots Adye, then breaks into Kemp's house. Adye's constables fend him off and Kemp bolts for the town, where the local citizenry come to his aid. Still obsessed with killing Kemp, Griffin nearly strangles the doctor but he is cornered, seized, and savagely beaten by the enraged mob, his last words a desperate cry for mercy. Despite Griffin's murderous actions, Kemp urges the mob to stand away and tries to save the life of his assailant, though unsuccessfully. The Invisible Man's battered body gradually becomes visible as he dies, pitiable in the stillness of death. A local policeman shouts to have someone cover Griffin's face with a sheet.

In the epilogue, it is revealed that Marvel has secretly kept Griffin's notes and—with the help of the stolen money—has now become a successful business owner, running the "Invisible Man Inn". However, when not running his inn, Marvel sits in his office trying to decipher the notes in the hopes of one day recreating Griffin's work. Because several pages were accidentally washed clean during Marvel's chase of Griffin, and the remaining notes are coded in Greek and Latin, and Marvel has no comprehension of even the basic mathematical symbols he sees in the notes, he is completely incapable of understanding them.

Background
Children's literature was a prominent genre in the 1890s. According to John Sutherland, Wells and his contemporaries such as Arthur Conan Doyle, Robert Louis Stevenson and Rudyard Kipling "essentially wrote boy's books for grown-ups." Sutherland identifies The Invisible Man as one such book. Wells said that his inspiration for the novella was "The Perils of Invisibility," one of the Bab Ballads by W. S. Gilbert, which includes the couplet "Old Peter vanished like a shot/but then - his suit of clothes did not." Another influence on The Invisible Man was Plato's Republic, a book which had a significant effect on Wells when he read it as an adolescent. In the second book of the Republic, Glaucon recounts the legend of the Ring of Gyges, which posits that, if a man were made invisible and could act with impunity, he would "go about among men with the powers of a god." Wells wrote the original version of the tale between March and June 1896. This version was a 25,000 word short story titled "The Man at the Coach and Horses" with which Wells was dissatisfied, so he extended it.

Scientific accuracy
Russian writer Yakov I. Perelman pointed out in Physics Can Be Fun (1962) that from a scientific point of view, a man made invisible by Griffin's method should have been blind because a human eye works by absorbing incoming light, not letting it through completely. Wells seems to show some awareness of this problem in Chapter 20, where the eyes of an otherwise invisible cat retain visible retinas. Nonetheless, this would be insufficient because the retina would be flooded with light (from all directions) that ordinarily is blocked by the opaque sclera of the eyeball. Also, any image would be badly blurred if the eye had an invisible cornea and lens.

Legacy

The Invisible Man has been adapted for, and referred to in, film, television, audio drama, and comics. Allen Grove, professor and chair of English at Alfred University states,

The Invisible Man has a wealth of progeny. The novel was adapted into comic book form by Classics Illustrated in the 1950s, and by Marvel Comics in 1976. Many writers and filmmakers also created sequels to the story, something the novel’s ambiguous ending encourages. Over a dozen movies and television series are based on the novel, including a 1933 James Whale film and a 1984 series by the BBC. The novel has been adapted for radio numerous times, including a 2017 audio version starring John Hurt as the invisible man. The cultural pervasiveness of the invisible man has led to everything from his cameo in an episode of Tom and Jerry to the Queen song "The Invisible Man".

See also

The War of the Worlds
The Secret of Wilhelm Storitz

References

Bibliography

External links

 
 
 
 3 may 2006 guardian article about Milton and Nicorovici's invention
 Horror-Wood: Invisible Man films
 Complete copy of The Invisible Man by HG Wells in HTML, ASCII and WORD

 
1897 British novels
British horror novels
British novellas
British science fiction novels
1897 science fiction novels
Novels by H. G. Wells
Novels set in London
Novels set in Sussex
Fiction about invisibility
Novels first published in serial form
British novels adapted into plays
British novels adapted into films
Novels adapted into radio programs
British novels adapted into television shows
Novels adapted into comics
Human experimentation in fiction
Science fiction novels adapted into films